Marxism Today, published between 1957 and 1991, was the theoretical magazine of the Communist Party of Great Britain. The magazine was headquartered in London. It was particularly important during the 1980s under the editorship of Martin Jacques. Through Marxism Today, Jacques is sometimes credited with coining the term "Thatcherism", and believed they were deconstructing the ideology of the government of the-then Prime Minister of the United Kingdom, Margaret Thatcher, through their theory of New Times. It was also a venue for the influential British cultural studies of Stuart Hall.

It was the standard-bearer for the reformist wing of the CPGB in the years 1977–1991. A special issue was published in 1998, seven years after the magazine's demise. Until 1998, the New Statesman described itself on an inside page as incorporating Marxism Today, among other titles.

See also
British left

References

External links
Barry Amiel and Norman Melburn Trust website All the issues of the journal from 1980 to 1991 are available in digital format copyright free (CC copyright). The site also includes an article on the journal's history by Martin Jacques.
  - A critical analysis.

1957 disestablishments in the United Kingdom
1991 disestablishments in the United Kingdom
Communist magazines
Communist Party of Great Britain
Defunct political magazines published in the United Kingdom
Magazines published in London
Magazines disestablished in 1957
Magazines disestablished in 1991
Marxist magazines